Sudesh Mahto is an Indian politician who was the former Deputy Chief Minister of Jharkhand. He is the member of Jharkhand Legislative Assembly from Silli. He won the first assembly election in 2000 when he was aged 25.

On the formation of Jharkhand he was inducted as Road Constructions Minister. He took over as Deputy Chief Minister of Jharkhand state on 29 December 2009. In 2019, he became M.L.A. of Silli.

Mahto represented the Silli Vidhan Sabha constituency in the legislative assembly of Jharkhand for three consecutive terms, being elected in 2000, 2005 and 2009. He is considered the face of youth in the state and is known to his supporters as Dada (elder brother).

To preserve the identity and history of Jharkhand, Mahto recently announced plans to build a statue of Birsa Munda, which will be known as Statue of Ulgulan and a statue of social reformer from Koyalanchal, Jharkhand movement leader Binod Bihari Mahato, which will be known as Statue of Revolution. Sudesh Mahto is a sports person and regularly plays football. He runs Birsa Munda Archery Academy in Silli which received the President Award in 2016 and has produced a Silver medal winning player in Asiad Olympics for India, Madhumita Kumari.

References

Deputy chief ministers of Jharkhand
Jharkhand MLAs 2009–2014
Jharkhand MLAs 2014–2019
Living people
Leaders of the Opposition in Jharkhand
All Jharkhand Students Union politicians
1974 births